Secret Ingredient is a 2017 Macedonian black comedy film directed by Gjorce Stavreski. It was selected as the Macedonian entry for the Best Foreign Language Film at the 91st Academy Awards, but it was not nominated.

Cast
 Blagoj Veselinov as Vele
 Anastas Tanovski as Sazdo
 Aksel Mehmet as Dzhem
 Aleksandar Mikic as Mrsni
 Miroslav Petkovic as Koki

See also
 List of submissions to the 91st Academy Awards for Best Foreign Language Film
 List of Macedonian submissions for the Academy Award for Best Foreign Language Film

References

External links
 

2017 films
2017 black comedy films
Macedonian comedy films
Macedonian-language films